Ming Ming (1977 – 7 May 2011) was the world's oldest giant panda. She died of kidney failure at age 34 at the Xiangjiang Wild Animal World in Guangdong Province. Her name translates from Chinese as "bright".

References

Individual giant pandas
2011 animal deaths
Deaths from kidney failure